This is a list of local government organizations i.e. associations or groupings of local governments and municipalities.

Australia
Australian Local Government Association
 Local Government NSW
 Local Government Association of Northern Territory
 Local Government Association of Queensland
 Local Government Association of South Australia
 Local Government Association of Tasmania
 Municipal Association of Victoria
 Western Australian Local Government Association

Bangladesh
Association of Central Councils
Bangladesh Local Government Association
White Crescent Society Local Authorities

Canada

Association francophone des municipalités du Nouveau-Brunswick (AFMNB)
Established: 1989

Association of Manitoba Municipalities (AMM)
Founded: 1999
Formed from the merger of:
 The Union of Manitoba Municipalities (UMM) – 1905-1999
 Manitoba Association of Urban Municipalities (MAUM) – est. 1949 – formerly the Manitoba Urban Association (MUA)
All municipalities in Manitoba are members

Association of Municipalities of Ontario (AMO)
Founded: 1972 
Formed from the merger of: 
 Ontario Municipal Association (OMA) – 1899-1972
 Association of Ontario Mayors and Reeves (AOMR) – 1944-1972
 Association of Counties and Regions (Ontario) (ACRO) – 1960-1982
 Ontario Association of Rural Municipalities (OARM) – 1933-1982
Current sub-associations within AMO:
 Association francaise des municipalités de l’Ontario (AFMO)
 Northwestern Ontario Municipal Association (NOMA)
 Federation of Northern Ontario Municipalities (FONOM)
 Eastern Ontario Wardens Group
 Western Ontario Wardens Group
 Large Urban Mayors Caucus Ontario (LUMCO)
 Regional Chairs Group
 Rural Ontario Municipal Association (ROMA)
 Organization of Small Urban Municipalities (OSUM)

Association des municipalités bilingues du Manitoba (AMBM)
Founded: 1995

Alberta Urban Municipalities Association (AUMA)
Founded: 1905
Formerly the Union of Alberta Municipalities (UAM)

Cities of New Brunswick Association – Association des cités du Nouveau-Brunswick (CNBA-ACNB)
Founded: 1948/1949

Federation of Canadian Municipalities (FCM)
Founded: 1937
Formed from the merger of the:
 Union of Canadian Municipalities (UCM) – 1901-1935
 Dominion Conference of Mayors (DCM) – 1935-1937
Formerly the Canadian Federation of Mayors and Municipalities (CFMM)

Federation of Prince Edward Island Municipalities (FPEIM)
Founded: 1957

Fédération Québécoise des Municipalités (FQM)
Founded: 1944

Municipalities Newfoundland and Labrador (MNL)
Founded: 1951
Formerly the Newfoundland Federation of Municipalities (NFM) and the Newfoundland and Labrador Federation of Municipalities (NLFM)

New North - SANC Services Inc.
Founded: 1996
Formerly the Saskatchewan Association of Northern Communities (SANC)

Provincial Association of Resort Communities of Saskatchewan (PARCS)
Founded: 1996

Rural Municipalities of Alberta (RMA)
Founded 1909
Formerly the Albert Association of Municipal Districts (AAMD), the Alberta Local Improvement Districts Association (ALIDA), and Alberta Association of Municipal Districts and Counties (AAMDC)

Saskatchewan Association of Rural Municipalities (SARM)
Founded: 1905
Formerly the Saskatchewan Local Improvement Districts Association (SLIDA)

Saskatchewan Urban Municipalities Association (SUMA)
Founded: 1906
Formerly the Union of Saskatchewan Municipalities (USM)

Union of British Columbia Municipalities (UBCM)
Founded: 1905
Area Associations within UBCM:
 Association of Kootenay and Boundary Local Governments (AKBLG)
 Association of Vancouver Island and Coastal Communities (AVICC)
 Lower Mainland Local Government Association (LMLGA)
 North Central Local Government Association (NCLA)
 Southern Interior Local Government Association (SILGA)

Union des municipalités du Québec (UMQ)
Founded: 1919

Union of Municipalities of New Brunswick (UMNB)
Founded: 1995
Formed for the merger of:
 Association of Villages of New Brunswick (AVNB)
 Towns of New Brunswick Association – L’Association des Villes du Nouveau-Brunswick (TNBA-AVNB)

Union of Nova Scotia Municipalities (UNSM)
Founded: 1906

Former Municipal Associations in Canada
Towns and Villages of New Brunswick (TVNB)
 1966-1974
 Split into Association of Villages of New Brunswick (AVNB) and Towns of New Brunswick Association – L’Association des Villes du Nouveau-Brunswick (TNBA-AVNB)
 AVNB and TNBA-AVNB merged to become UMNB
Union of New Brunswick Municipalities (UNBM)
 1907-1970
 Last convention: 1966
 Last meeting: 1968
 Disbanded after the New Brunswick Equal Opportunities Program dissolved county governments

Croatia
Joint Council of Municipalities (Council of Municipalities with a Serbian majority population established on the basis of Erdut Agreement)
Croatian community of municipalities (Association that connects 347 of 428 municipalities across Croatia)
Association of Towns of the Republic of Croatia (Association that connects 126 of 128 towns across Croatia)
Croatian community of counties (Association that connects all 20 counties and city of Zagreb)

Czech Republic
Sdružení místních samospráv ČR
Svaz měst a obcí České republiky
Asociace krajů České republiky

Denmark
Venskabsbyforeningen i Ribe

Faroe Islands
Føroya Kommunufelag (municipal organization of the Faroe Islands)

Greenland
KANUKOKA (municipal organization of Greenland)

Germany
 Deutscher Städtetag (Association of German Cities)
 German Association of Towns and Municipalities

Iran
the Union of Municipalities (Defunct / Disbanded)
Supreme Council of Provinces
Organization of Municipalities and Villages of the country

Ireland
Local Government Management Agency

Italy
Standing Committee for EuromMediterranean Partnership of local and regional authorities COPPEM -

Japan
Greater Nagoya Initiative

Netherlands
Interprovinciaal Overleg
Association of Netherlands Municipalities
Samenwerkingsverband Regio Eindhoven

Norway
Landssamanslutninga av Vasskraftkommunar (It groups municipalities that are involved in hydropower production)

Philippines
Each local government level and elective position has its own league:
Union of Local Authorities of the Philippines
League of Provinces of the Philippines
League of Vice Governors of the Philippines
Provincial Board Members League of the Philippines
League of Cities of the Philippines
League of Municipalities of the Philippines
Vice Mayors' League of the Philippines
Philippine Councilors League
League of Barangays in the Philippines
Metro Manila Councilors League

Poland
The Association of Polish Cities (Związek Miast Polskich)
The Union of Polish Metropolises (Unia Metropolii Polskich)
Association of Polish Counties (Związek Powiatów Polskich)
The Union of Rural Communes of the Republic of Poland (Związek Gmin Wiejskich RP)

Slovakia
Združenie miest a obcí Slovenska
Únia miest Slovenska

Slovenia
Association of Municipalities and Towns of Slovenia

Sweden
Swedish Association of Local Authorities and Regions (Sveriges Kommuner och Landsting)
National Association of Swedish Eco-Municipalities (Sveriges Ekokommuner)

Ukraine
Association of Amalgamated Territorial Communities (Всеукраїнська Асоціація об’єднаних територіальних громад)
The Association of Ukrainian Cities (Асоціація міст України)

United Kingdom
Local Government Association (England and Wales)

England
East of England Local Government Association
East Midlands Councils
Association of North East Councils
North West Regional Leaders Board
South East England Councils
South West Councils
West Midlands Councils
Local Government Yorkshire and Humber

Northern Ireland
Northern Ireland Local Government Association

Scotland
Convention of Scottish Local Authorities

Wales
Welsh Local Government Association

United States
National League of Cities
Michigan Municipal League
United States Conference of Mayors
Maricopa Association of Governments
National Association of Counties
Arizona Association of Counties
New Jersey State League of Municipalities (voluntary association created by State Statute in 1915)
GMIS International

International
Alpine Pearls
Arab Towns Organization
Council of European Municipalities and Regions
Euro Mediterranean Partnership of Local and Regional Authorities
League of Historical Cities
Municipal Alliance for Peace
Organization of World Heritage Cities
Sister Cities International

See also
Decentralization
List of intergovernmental organizations
Localism
Regionalism
Tertiary government

References

 
Lists of organizations
Organizations